Sabaneta is a municipality of Colombia, located in the Aburrá Valley of the Antioquia department. It is bordered on the north by the municipalities of La Estrella, Itagüí and Envigado, on the east  by the municipality of Envigado, on the south by the municipality of Caldas, and on the west by the municipality of La Estrella.

It is the smallest municipality in Colombia, with an area of only 15 km². It is known as the Municipio Modelo de Colombia ("Model Municipality of Colombia") or the Vallecito de Encanto ("Charming little Valley"). The municipality owes its name to the diminutive "sabana," a Spanish word meaning "savannah".

The population receives an influx of visitors on the weekends because of its reputation for having outstanding entertainment venues.

History 
Sabaneta was initially inhabited by the Anacona indigenous peoples (aboriginals from the other side of the Aná), who settled the eastern slope, starting from the hill of Pan de Azucar. In 1750, Spanish families settled here. The Montoya, Restrepo, Vélez, Díaz, Díez, Vásquez, Guzmán, Garcés, Baena, Salazar, Mejía, Mesas, Álvarez and Soto families were the second group to populate this region.

Geography 
Sabaneta, which sits at the south end of the Aburrá Valley, is part of the process of conurbation of the Medellín Metropolitan Area, being located 14 kilometers from the center of the city of Medellín. The municipality has an area of 15 km², of which 67% of the territory is urban.

Its topography varies from flat reliefs and slight hills to places with steep slopes. Its most notable heights are those of Piedras Blancas (2,650 mamsl) in La Romera, the Cuchilla Santa Teresa (2,200 mamsl), the hill of Los Gallinazos in Pan de Azúcar (1,800 mamsl), the hill Morrón, La Siberia and the Ancón.

The main stream is the Medellín River, which serves as its border with the municipality Itagüí. The most important tributary of this river, in the municipality, is the La Doctora gorge, along with the streams Buenavista, La Escuela, El Gusano, El Canalón, La Honda, La Sabanetica and La Cien Pesos, which mark its borders with Envigado.

External links
 Sabaneta official website

References

Municipalities of Antioquia Department
The Metropolitan Area of the Aburrá Valley